One of These Days may refer to:

Songs
 "One of These Days" (instrumental), a 1971 song by Pink Floyd from the album Meddle
 "One of These Days" (Marcus Hummon song), a 1995 song later covered by Tim McGraw
 "One of These Days" (Emmylou Harris song), a 1976 song by Emmylou Harris from the album Elite Hotel
 "These Boots Are Made for Walkin'", a 1966 song by Nancy Sinatra, covered by Operation Ivy as "One of These Days"
 "One of These Days", a song released by 78 Saab from the album The Bells Line
 "One of These Days", a song released by The 88 from the album This Must Be Love
 "One of These Days", a song released by American Steel from the album Rogue's March
 "One of These Days", a song released by Barry Manilow from the self-titled album
 "One of These Days", a song released by Caliban from the album The Opposite from Within
 "One of These Days", a song released by Camper Van Beethoven from the album Our Beloved Revolutionary Sweetheart
 "One of These Days", a song released by Charley Pride from the album Songs of Pride...Charley That Is
 "One of These Days", a song released by David Hopkins from the album Running with Knives
 "One of These Days", a song released by David Ruffin, B-side of the single "I'm in Love"
 "One of These Days", a song released by Doves from the album Some Cities
 "One of These Days", a song released by Drive-By Truckers from the album Pizza Deliverance
 "One of These Days", a song released by FFH from the album I Want to Be Like You
 "One of These Days", a song released by Gerard McMahon from the film Spring Break
 "One of These Days", a song released by The Grapes from the album Private Stock
 "One of These Days", a song released by Imani Coppola from the album Chupacabra
 "One of These Days", a song released by Jill Sobule from the album Pink Pearl
 "One of These Days", a song released by John Lee Hooker from the album That's My Story
 "One of These Days", a song released by LeAnn Rimes from the album I Need You
 "One of These Days", a song released by Mark Wills from the album Loving Every Minute
 "One of These Days", a song released by Marvin Gaye from the album Marvin Gaye Recorded Live on Stage
 "One of These Days", a song released by Matthew E. White from the album Big Inner
 "One of These Days", a song released by Michelle Branch from the album Hotel Paper
 "One of These Days", a song released by Michelle Wright from the album Strong
 "One of These Days", a song released by Mose Allison from the album The Word from Mose
 "One of These Days", a song released by Nanci Griffith from the album The Last of the True Believers
 "One of These Days", a song released by Neil Young from the album Harvest Moon
 "One of These Days", a song released by New Monsoon from the album Downstream
 "One of These Days", a song released by Olly Murs from the album Right Place Right Time
 "One of These Days", a song released by Owen from the album At Home with Owen
 "One of These Days", a song released by Paul McCartney from the album McCartney II
 "One of These Days", a song released by Prozak featuring Tech N9ne and Krizz Kaliko from Prozak's album Paranormal
 "One of These Days", a song released by Saga from the album 20/20
 "One of These Days", a song released by Santana featuring Ozomatli from Santana's album Shaman
 "One of These Days", a song released by The Searchers from the album Sugar and Spice
 "One of These Days", a song released by See You Next Tuesday from the album Intervals
 "One of These Days", a song released by Shane Filan from the album You and Me
 "One of These Days", a song released by Smalltown Poets from the album Listen Closely
 "One of These Days", a song released by Spacehog from the album The Chinese Album
 "One of These Days", a song released by Steve Wickham from the album Geronimo
 "One of These Days", a song released by Teddy Thompson from the album A Piece of What You Need
 "One of These Days", a song released by Ten Years After from the album A Space in Time
 "One of These Days", a song released by Tim Christensen from the album Superior
 "One of These Days", a song released by Tracy Bonham from the album Wax & Gold
 "One of These Days", a song released by The Velvet Underground from the album VU
 "One of These Days", a song released by Whitesnake from the album Forevermore
 "One of These Days", a song released by Within Temptation from the single "And We Run"
 "One of These Days", a song released by Wu-Tang Clan from the album Iron Flag

Other uses
 "One of These Days", a short story by Gabriel García Márquez
 One of These Days, a 2003 album by Helen Slater

See also
 These Days (disambiguation)
 One of Those Days (disambiguation)